Camarines Sur's 5th congressional district is one of the five congressional districts in the province of Camarines Sur. It has been represented in the House of Representatives since 2010. The district was created following the 2009 reapportionment that split the 1st district into two thereby creating an additional district for the province. The district consists of the city of Iriga and adjacent municipalities in the Partido region of southern Camarines Sur that previously comprised the 4th district, namely Baao, Balatan, Bato, Buhi, Bula and Nabua. It is currently represented in the 19th Congress by Miguel Luis Villafuerte of the PDP-Laban.

Representation history

Election results

2022

2019

2016

2013

2010

See also
Legislative districts of Camarines Sur

References

Congressional districts of the Philippines
Politics of Camarines Sur
2009 establishments in the Philippines
Congressional districts of the Bicol Region
Constituencies established in 2009